ATCF may refer to:

 Automated Tropical Cyclone Forecasting System, software used for forecasting tropical cyclones within United States agencies
 Automobile and Touring Club of Finland, with member magazine Moottori, the oldest automobile magazine in Finland
 Advanced Technology Combat Folder, a model of knife from Robert Terzuola